HD 6434 b is an extrasolar planet orbiting the star HD 6434. It has a minimum mass about half that of Jupiter. It orbits the star very close, over 2.5 times as close as Mercury orbits the Sun. For this reason it completes one orbit in only 22 days. Unlike true "hot Jupiters" like 51 Pegasi b, HD 6434 b does not have a circular orbit, but rather an eccentric one.

The planet HD 6434 b is named Eyeke. The name was selected in the NameExoWorlds campaign by Ecuador, during the 100th anniversary of the IAU. Eyeke means near in the language spoken by the Indigenous Waorani tribes.

By studying observations taken by the Hipparcos astrometric mission, a group of scientists proposed that the planet has an inclination of 179.9° (almost exactly face-on) and a mass of 196 Jupiters. If that was the case, the planet would be a red dwarf instead. However, the data was anything but conclusive, and statistically it is extremely unlikely to lie in such a position. But because the inclination is unknown, so is the true mass of the planet. Still, it is very probable that the object is a true planet.

See also
 94 Ceti b

References

External links
 

Exoplanets discovered in 2003
Giant planets
Phoenix (constellation)
Exoplanets detected by radial velocity
Exoplanets with proper names